The J. C. Penney–Chicago Store is a historic department store building in downtown Tucson, Arizona.  Built in 1903 for the Los Angeles Furniture Co, it housed J. C. Penney by July 25, 1942.  In 1957, after J. C. Penney moved to the west side of Stone Avenue just north of Pennington Street, Aaronson Brothers moved in.  The Chicago Store moved in after the El Pasobased department store closed in 1967. This building had the last complete original vintage interior in Downtown Tucson with stamped tin ceilings and period woodwork until it was completely gutted in 2020-2022.

References

External links
 Aerial View
 FR Doc 03-21971

Buildings and structures in Tucson, Arizona
JCPenney
Retail buildings in Arizona
Commercial buildings on the National Register of Historic Places in Arizona
Department stores on the National Register of Historic Places
National Register of Historic Places in Tucson, Arizona
Economy of Tucson, Arizona